The following elections occurred in the year 1995.

Africa
 1995 Algerian presidential election
 1995 Beninese parliamentary election
 1995 Cape Verdean parliamentary election
 1995 Ethiopian general election
 1995 Guinean legislative election
 1995 Ivorian parliamentary election
 1995 Ivorian presidential election
 1995 Mauritian general election
 1995 Nigerien parliamentary election
 1995 Tanzanian general election
 1995 Zimbabwean parliamentary election

Asia
 1995–1996 Azerbaijani parliamentary election
 1995 Kazakhstani legislative election
 1995 Philippine House of Representatives elections
 1995 Philippine Senate election
 1995 Philippine general election
 1995 Republic of China legislative election
 1995 Iraqi presidential referendum
 1995 Japanese House of Councillors election
 1995 Malaysian general election
 1995 Russian legislative election
 1995 Turkish general election

India
 1995 Bihar Legislative Assembly election
 1995 Maharashtra state assembly elections

Europe
 1995 Ålandic legislative election
 1995 Belarusian parliamentary election
 1995 Belarusian referendum
 1995 Belgian federal election
 1995 Belgian regional elections
 1995 Croatian parliamentary election
 1995 Estonian parliamentary election
 1995 European Parliament election in Sweden 
 1995 Finnish parliamentary election
 1995 Georgian presidential election
 1995 Icelandic parliamentary election
 1995 Latvian parliamentary election
 1995 Lombard regional election
 1995 North Rhine-Westphalia state election
 1995 Norwegian local elections
 1995 Polish presidential election
 1995 Portuguese legislative election
 1995 Venetian regional election
 1995 Umbrian regional election
 1995 Moldovan local elections
 1995 Transnistrian constitutional referendum
 1995 Russian legislative election
 1995 Austrian legislative election

European Parliament
 1995 European Parliament election in Sweden

France
 1995 French municipal elections
 1995 French presidential election

Spain
 1995 Catalan parliamentary election
 1995 Valencian regional election
 1995 Aragonese regional election

United Kingdom
 1995 Conservative Party leadership election
 1995 Islwyn by-election
 1995 Littleborough and Saddleworth by-election
 1995 United Kingdom local elections
 1995 North Down by-election
 1995 Perth and Kinross by-election
 1995 Scottish local elections
 March 1995 Ulster Unionist Party leadership election
 September 1995 Ulster Unionist Party leadership election

United Kingdom local
 1995 United Kingdom local elections

English local
 1995 Bristol City Council election
 1995 Hinckley and Bosworth Council election
 1995 Manchester Council election
 1995 Trafford Council election
 1995 Wolverhampton Council election

Scottish local
 1995 Highland Council election

North America

Canada
 1995 Edmonton municipal election
 1995 Manitoba general election
 1995 Manitoba municipal elections
 1995 New Brunswick general election
 1995 New Democratic Party leadership election
 1995 Northwest Territories general election
 1995 Nunavut capital plebiscite
 1995 Ontario general election
 1995 Progressive Conservative Party of New Brunswick leadership election
 1995 Quebec independence referendum
 1995 Saskatchewan general election
 1995 Winnipeg municipal election

Caribbean
 1995 Haitian general election
 1995 Trinidad and Tobago general election

United States

United States mayoral
 1995 Houston mayoral election
 1995 Philadelphia mayoral election
 1995 San Francisco mayoral election
 1995 Philadelphia mayoral election

United States gubernatorial
 1995 Louisiana gubernatorial election
 1995 United States gubernatorial elections
 1995 Louisiana gubernatorial election

United States House of Representatives
 1995 Illinois's 2nd congressional district special election

Oceania
 1995 Vanuatuan general election

Australia
 1995 Australian Capital Territory general election
 1995 Canberra by-election
 1995 New South Wales referendums
 1995 New South Wales state election
 1995 Queensland state election
 1995 Wentworth by-election

New Zealand
 1995 New Zealand firefighter referendum

South America
 1995 Guatemalan general election
 1995 Argentine general election
 1995 Peruvian general election

See also

 
1995
Elections